Stéphane Houdet and Michaël Jérémiasz defeated the two-time defending champion Robin Ammerlaan and his partner Shingo Kunieda in the final, 1–6, 6–4, 7–6(7–3) to win the gentlemen's doubles wheelchair tennis title at the 2009 Wimbledon Championships.

Ammerlaan and Ronald Vink were the two-time defending champions, but did not compete together. Vink partnered Maikel Scheffers, but was defeated by Ammerlaan and Kunieda in the semifinals.

Seeds

  Stéphane Houdet /  Michaël Jeremiasz (champions)
  Maikel Scheffers /  Ronald Vink (semifinals)

Draw

Finals

External links
Draw

Men's Wheelchair Doubles
Wimbledon Championship by year – Wheelchair men's doubles